Englewood station may refer to:

 Englewood station (Chicago) in the Englewood neighborhood of Chicago, Illinois
 Englewood station (Erie Railroad) in Englewood, New Jersey
 Englewood station (RTD) in Englewood, Colorado
 Englewood Avenue (MBTA station) in Brookline, Massachusetts